"" is a song by German band Juli. It was written by band members Jonas Pfetzing and Eva Briegel along with singer Diane Weigmann for their debut album, Es ist Juli (2004), while production was helmed by O.L.A.F. Opal.

Formats and track listings

Charts

References

Songs about weather
Songs about oceans and seas
2005 singles
Juli (band) songs
Songs written by Eva Briegel
2005 songs
German-language songs